Seamus Robinson may refer to:

Seamus Robinson (fencer) (born 1975), Australian fencer
Séumas Robinson (Irish republican) (1890–1961), Irish rebel and politician